Armando Castro (born 10 December 1952) is a Mexican rower. He competed in the men's coxed pair event at the 1968 Summer Olympics.

References

External links
 

1952 births
Living people
Mexican male rowers
Olympic rowers of Mexico
Rowers at the 1968 Summer Olympics
Rowers from Mexico City